The Kheyvis fire was a fire in the Kheyvis nightclub in Olivos, Buenos Aires, Argentina. On 20 December 1993, a fire in the club caused the deaths of 17 teenagers in a graduation party for the La Salle College. It is believed to have been caused by the burning of furniture as a prank, although no one was charged with starting it.

The Kheyvis fire led to tougher regulations, including mandatory emergency exits and extensive security inspections of existing nightclubs. Until the República Cromagnon fire on 30 December 2004 in Buenos Aires, the Kheyvis fire was the worst nightclub tragedy in Argentine history.

External links

 a tribute site to the victims of the disaster (Spanish)

Arson in Argentina
1993 in Argentina
Burned buildings and structures
Fires in Argentina
December 1993 events in South America
Nightclub fires
1993 fires in South America